Bigorio Monastery (German: Kapuzinerkloster Bigorio, Italian: Convento di Santa Maria Assunta) is a Capuchin monastery in the village of Bigorio, in Capriasca, in the canton of Ticino, Switzerland. It was founded in 1535 as the first seat of the Capuchins in Switzerland.

See also
 Inventory of Swiss Heritage Sites

External links

 Monastery website

Religious buildings and structures in Ticino
Capuchin friaries
16th-century establishments in Switzerland
16th-century architecture in Switzerland